Voreppe is a commune in the Isère department in southeastern France. It is part of the Grenoble urban unit (agglomeration).

Population

Twin towns
Voreppe is twinned with:

  Lichtenstein, Baden-Württemberg, Germany, since 1992
  Castelnovo ne' Monti, Italy, since 1994
  Lapoș, Romania, since 1990

See also
Communes of the Isère department

References

Communes of Isère
Isère communes articles needing translation from French Wikipedia